National Highway 144 is a national highway in the union territory of Jammu and Kashmir of India. NH-144 is a branch of National Highway 44.

History 
Domel to Katra, 8 km section of this highway was previously named as National Highway 1C before new numbering of national highway system was introduced.

Route 
Domel, Katra, Reasi, Pouni and Bamla.

Junctions 

  Terminal at Domel junction (formerly ).
  Terminal near Bamla.

See also 
 List of National Highways in India
 List of National Highways in India by state
 List of National Highways in India (by Highway Number)
 National Highways Development Project

References

External links
 NH 144 on OpenStreetMap
 NH 1C on OpenStreetMap
 NH network map of India

National highways in India
National Highways in Jammu and Kashmir